Yaw Yeboah (born 28 March 1997) is a Ghanaian professional footballer who plays as a right winger for Major League Soccer club Columbus Crew.

Career

Right to Dream Academy 
Yeboah joined the Right to Dream Academy in 2008 and graduated in 2014.

Manchester City
Yeboah joined Manchester City in 2014.

Loan to Lille
On 14 August 2015, it was announced that Yeboah would be loaned to Lille OSC for one year. He made his debut for Lille on 25 October 2015 against Marseille in Ligue 1. He only made three appearances for Lille, playing a total of 174 minutes.

Loan to Twente
On 21 July 2016, Yeboah made a loan move to Dutch side FC Twente. He scored his first goal for the club on 27 August, in a 3–1 win over Sparta Rotterdam. His second goal came two months later on 22 October, in a 2–0 win over Go Ahead Eagles.

Loan to Oviedo
On 1 September 2017, Yeboah was loaned to Spanish side Real Oviedo on a season long-loan, with the Spanish club having the option to sign him permanently.

Numancia
On 18 July 2018, Yeboah signed a three-year contract with fellow Segunda División team CD Numancia.

Loan to Celta
On 30 July 2019, Yeboah joined RC Celta de Vigo on loan for one year, being initially assigned to the B-team in Segunda División B; the deal also included a buyout clause.

Wisła Kraków
On 11 August 2020, Yeboah completed a move to Ekstraklasa side Wisła Kraków, signing a three-year deal. He played 47 matches in Ekstraklasa, scoring 9 goals.

Columbus Crew
On 6 January 2022, Yeboah signed a three-year deal with Major League Soccer side Columbus Crew from Wisła Kraków.

International career

Youth
Yeboah has made appearances for the Ghana U-20 team. He was awarded "most valuable player" in the 2015 African U-20 Championship scoring two goals. He then played in the 2015 FIFA U-20 World Cup, making four appearances and scoring two goals, both from penalties.

Senior
Yeboah received his first call up on 26 August 2016, for a 2017 Africa Cup of Nations qualification match against Rwanda and a friendly against Russia. He made the bench for the match against Russia, but failed to make an appearance. Yeboah made his senior debut with the Ghana national team in a friendly 1–0 loss to Namibia on 9 June 2019.

Career statistics

Club

International 
As of 16 May 2022

Honours
Ghana U20

 African U-20 Championship third place: 2015

Individual
African U-20 Championship Most Valuable Player: 2015
Ekstraklasa Player of the Month: August 2021

References

External links

1997 births
Living people
Footballers from Accra
Ghanaian footballers
Ghana international footballers
Ghana under-20 international footballers
Association football wingers
Manchester City F.C. players
Lille OSC players
FC Twente players
Real Oviedo players
CD Numancia players
Celta de Vigo B players
Wisła Kraków players
Columbus Crew players
Ligue 1 players
Eredivisie players
Segunda División players
Ekstraklasa players
Ghanaian expatriate footballers
Ghanaian expatriate sportspeople in France
Ghanaian expatriate sportspeople in the Netherlands
Ghanaian expatriate sportspeople in Spain
Ghanaian expatriate sportspeople in the United States
Expatriate footballers in France
Expatriate footballers in the Netherlands
Expatriate footballers in Spain
Expatriate footballers in Poland
Expatriate soccer players in the United States
Major League Soccer players